The women's individual time trial was one of eighteen  cycling events of the 2016 Olympic Games. The event started and finished on 10 August at Pontal, a small peninsula and beach area in the Recreio dos Bandeirantes neighborhood, located in the West Zone of Rio de Janeiro, Brazil. The race start and finish were part of the Barra venues cluster and one of seven temporary venues of the 2016 Summer Olympics.

Qualification

Pre-race favourites
American Kristin Armstrong was the 2008 and 2012 gold medalist. However, with the event scheduled one day before her forty-third birthday, Armstrong was not among the betting favorites.

The world champions after the 2012 Summer Olympics were the Dutch Ellen van Dijk (2013), German Lisa Brennauer (2014) and the New Zealand Linda Villumsen (2015). More recently, Ellen van Dijk had won the time trial in the 2016 Energiewacht Tour, beating Villumsen (3rd) and Brennauer (9th).

Course
The women's course was one lap of the  Grumari circuit.

Start list and result

The following 18 NOCs had qualified a total of 25 riders to compete in the road time trial event. The following riders were confirmed by their respective NOCs.

References

External links
Rio de Janeiro Olympic venues map (rio2016.com)

Women's road time trial
2016 in women's road cycling
Cycling at the Summer Olympics – Women's individual time trial
Women's events at the 2016 Summer Olympics